The Murcki coal mine is a large mine in the south of Poland in Katowice, Silesian Voivodeship, 260 km south-west of the capital, Warsaw. Murcki represents one of the largest coal reserve in Poland having estimated reserves of 228.2 million tonnes of coal. The annual coal production is around 3.8 million tonnes.

References

External links 
 Official site

Coal mines in Poland
Buildings and structures in Katowice
Coal mines in Silesian Voivodeship